The Jonathan Pyne House, formerly the Richard Stites Jr. House, is located in Lower Township, Cape May County, New Jersey, United States. The house was built in 1694 and added to the National Register of Historic Places on February 14, 1997.

See also
National Register of Historic Places listings in Cape May County, New Jersey
List of the oldest buildings in New Jersey

References

Lower Township, New Jersey
Houses on the National Register of Historic Places in New Jersey
Federal architecture in New Jersey
Houses completed in 1694
Houses in Cape May County, New Jersey
National Register of Historic Places in Cape May County, New Jersey
New Jersey Register of Historic Places
1694 establishments in New Jersey